Calverley and Farsley is a ward in the metropolitan borough of the City of Leeds, West Yorkshire, England.  It contains 49 listed buildings that are recorded in the National Heritage List for England.  Of these, one is listed at Grade I, the highest of the three grades, two are at Grade II*, the middle grade, and the others are at Grade II, the lowest grade.  The ward contains the town of Farsley with the district of Stanningley to the south, the villages of Calverley and Rodley in the north of the ward, and the surrounding area.  Most of the listed buildings are houses, cottages and associated structures, farmhouses and farm buildings.  The Leeds and Liverpool Canal passes through the ward and the listed buildings associated with it are two swing bridges and warehouses. The other listed buildings include churches, chapels and items in churchyards, public houses, a bridge over the River Aire, a mill building, schools, and two war memorials.


Key

Buildings

References

Citations

Sources

 

Lists of listed buildings in West Yorkshire